Katie Kitamura is an American novelist, journalist, and art critic. She is currently an Honorary Research Fellow at the London Consortium.

Early life and education
Katie Kitamura was born in Sacramento, California in 1979 to a family of Japanese origin, and raised in Davis, where her father Ryuichi was a professor at UC Davis Department of Civil and Environmental Engineering.

Kitamura graduated from Princeton University in New Jersey in 1999. She earned a PhD in American literature from the London Consortium. Her thesis was titled The Aesthetics of Vulgarity and the Modern American Novel (2005).

Earlier in her life, Kitamura trained as a ballerina.

Career
Kitamura wrote Japanese for Travellers: A Journey, describing her travels across Japan and examining the dichotomies of its society and her own place in it as a Japanese-American.

Kitamura was introduced to mixed martial arts in Japan by her brother. Her first novel, The Longshot, published in 2009, is about the preparation undertaken by a fighter and his trainer ahead of a championship bout against a famous opponent. The cover art of the US edition of her book features the title tattooed on knuckles; the knuckles are her brother's. Kitamura's second novel, Gone to the Forest, published in 2013, is set in an unnamed colonial country and describes the life and suffering of a landowning family against a backdrop of civil strife and political change.

Kitamura's 2017 novel A Separation will be adapted for a film starring Katherine Waterston. Her novel Intimacies appeared in 2021.

Kitamura writes for The Guardian, The New York Times, and Wired. She has written articles on mixed martial arts, film criticism and analysis, and art.

Awards and recognition
In 2010, Kitamura's The Longshot was shortlisted for the New York Public Library's Young Lions Fiction Award.  In 2013, her Gone to the Forest was also shortlisted for the Young Lions Fiction Award. In 2021, Kitamura's Intimacies was longlisted for the National Book Award for Fiction.

Selected bibliography

Autobiography

Novels

Journalism 
 Art criticism in frieze magazine.
 Art criticism in Contemporary magazine.

Personal life
Kitamura is married to author Hari Kunzru.

References 

1979 births
American writers of Japanese descent
Writers from California
21st-century American novelists
American women novelists
American novelists of Asian descent
American women journalists of Asian descent
Living people
21st-century American women writers
Princeton University alumni